The handball tournament at the 1967 Mediterranean Games was held in Tunis, Tunisia.

Four men's national teams took part in the competition, which was played in a round-robin format, with each team playing every other team once.

Medalists

Standings

References
1967 Mediterranean Games report at the International Committee of Mediterranean Games (CIJM) website
List of Olympians who won medals at the Mediterranean Games at Olympedia.org
Yugoslavia at the 1967 Mediterranean Games at the Olympic Museum Belgrade website

Handball at the Mediterranean Games
Sports at the 1967 Mediterranean Games
International handball competitions hosted by Tunisia